In May 2019 significant property tax reform bills passed the Texas Legislature, promising property tax relief and higher funding for schools. Senate Bill 2 tackles property tax issues, and House Bill 3 directly deals with school finance reform. House Bill 3 raised the amount per student each district is allotted from $5,140 to $6,030, and also reduces school property tax rates by about four percent per $100 in property value.  House Bill 1 is the overall budget for Texas. The tax reduction was achieved by allocating $6.6 billion from the rainy-day fund, leaving an estimated $8.4 billion in two years.  In these three bills, the 86th Legislature of Texas increased school funding as well as lowering the burden on property owners.

References

Texas law
Property taxes
Property law in the United States